Konyukhi is a rural locality (a settlement) in Barnaul, Altai Krai, Russia. The population was 18 as of 2013.

Geography 
Konyukhi is located 27 km south of Barnaul by road. Belmesyovo is the nearest rural locality.

References 

Rural localities in Barnaul urban okrug